Psilocerea is a genus of moths in the family Geometridae described by Max Saalmüller in 1880.

Some species of this genus are:
 Psilocerea acerata D. S. Fletcher, 1978
 Psilocerea albivertex Herbulot, 1992
 Psilocerea anearia Swinhoe, 1904
 Psilocerea arabica Wiltshire, 1983
 Psilocerea aspilates Herbulot, 1954
 Psilocerea barychorda Prout, 1932
 Psilocerea carbo Herbulot, 1970
 Psilocerea catenosa Herbulot, 1970
 Psilocerea cneca Prout, 1932
 Psilocerea coronata D. S. Fletcher, 1958
 Psilocerea cuprea Herbulot, 1959
 Psilocerea dysonaria Swinhoe, 1904
 Psilocerea ferruginaria (Mabille, 1898)
 Psilocerea gratiosa Prout, 1927
 Psilocerea griveaudi Herbulot, 1959
 Psilocerea harmonia Prout, 1932
 Psilocerea hypermetra Prout, 1931
 Psilocerea icterias Herbulot, 1973
 Psilocerea immitata Janse, 1932
 Psilocerea insularia (Mabille, 1880)
 Psilocerea jacobi Prout, 1932
 Psilocerea kenricki Prout, 1925
 Psilocerea krooni Krüger, 2007
 Psilocerea laevigata D. S. Fletcher, 1958
 Psilocerea lemur Herbulot, 1954
 Psilocerea leptosyne D. S. Fletcher, 1978
 Psilocerea melanops Carcasson, 1965
 Psilocerea monochroma Herbulot, 1954
 Psilocerea narychorda Prout 1932
 Psilocerea nigromaculata Warren, 1897
 Psilocerea olsoufieffae Prout, 1932
 Psilocerea penicillata Herbulot, 1957
 Psilocerea phrynogyna Herbulot, 1954
 Psilocerea praecoca Herbulot, 1981
 Psilocerea pronisi Viette, 1980
 Psilocerea phrynogyna Herbulot, 1954
 Psilocerea psegma Herbulot, 1981
 Psilocerea pulverosa (Warren, 1894)
 Psilocerea rachicera (Butler, 1880)
 Psilocerea russulata (Mabille, 1898)
 Psilocerea rutila D. S. Fletcher, 1958
 Psilocerea scardamyctes Prout, 1925
 Psilocerea semifacta Prout, 1926
 Psilocerea semirufa (Warren, 1901)
 Psilocerea severa Prout, 1932
 Psilocerea solitaria (Herbulot, 1992)
 Psilocerea swinhoei Herbulot, 1959
 Psilocerea szunyoghi D. S. Fletcher, 1978
 Psilocerea tigrinata Saalmüller, 1880
 Psilocerea toulgoeti Herbulot, 1959
 Psilocerea tristigma Herbulot, 1959
 Psilocerea turpis Warren, 1902
 Psilocerea vestitaria Swinhoe, 1904
 Psilocerea viettei Herbulot, 1954
 Psilocerea virescens Herbulot, 1954
 Psilocerea wintreberti Herbulot, 1970

References

Geometridae